Romaldo "Aldo" Giurgola AO (2 September 1920 – 16 May 2016) was an Italian academic, architect, professor, and author. Giurgola was born in Rome, Italy in 1920.  After service in the Italian armed forces during World War II, he was educated at the Sapienza University of Rome. He studied architecture at the University of Rome, completing the equivalent of a B.Arch. with honors in 1949. That same year, he moved to the United States and received a master's degree in architecture from Columbia University. In 1954, Giurgola accepted a position as an assistant professor of architecture at the University of Pennsylvania. Shortly thereafter, Giurgola formed Mitchell/Giurgola Architects in Philadelphia with Ehrman B. Mitchell in 1958. In 1966, Giurgola became chair of the Columbia University School of Architecture and Planning in New York City, where he opened a second office of the firm. In 1980 under Giurgola's direction, the firm won an international competition to design a new Australian parliament building. Giurgola moved to Canberra, Australia to oversee the project. In 1989, after its completion and official opening in 1988, the Parliament House was recognized with the top award for public architecture in Australia.

Professor
Giurgola was a professor at Cornell University and at the University of Pennsylvania, before becoming chair of the Columbia Architecture Department in 1966. He was later named the Ware Professor Emeritus of Architecture at Columbia.

Architect
The first important building of Mitchell/Giurgola was the Wright Brothers National Memorial Visitor Center (1957) for the US National Park Service, a building that brought them national attention for three reasons. It was one of the first NPS visitors' centers that became a building type unto itself. The design was consonant with a certain aesthetic preoccupation with aviation, flight, technology and space travel of the time, the same zeitgeist that produced Saarinen's TWA Terminal at John F. Kennedy International Airport. It was seen as a break with strict modernist tenets in its respect for the site and the program, as opposed to what Giurgola called "the imposition of abstract forms".

In Philadelphia, Giurgola had formed a relationship with Louis Kahn, who held similar views.  In April 1961 the architectural critic Jan Rowan grouped Giurgola, Kahn, Robert Venturi, George Qualls, Robert Geddes and others, into "The Philadelphia School".    Giurgola published several books on Kahn's work and philosophy.

Parliament House competition
Giurgola was invited to join the panel of judges for the 1980 international competition for the landmark Australian Parliament House in Canberra. Instead, he chose to enter the competition. After winning, Giurgola moved to Australia and practised there.  He adopted Australian citizenship in January 2000.

Honours and awards
In 1978, he was a Resident in Architecture at the American Academy in Rome.

In 1982, he was awarded the AIA Gold Medal by the American Institute of Architects.

In 1982 he was elected into the National Academy of Design as an Associate member, and became a full Academician in 1994.

The Association of Collegiate Schools of Architecture (ACSA) honored Giurgola with its Distinguished Professor Award in 1987-88.

He was awarded the RAIA Gold Medal by the Royal Australian Institute of Architects in 1988.

In January 1989 he was appointed an Honorary Officer of the Order of Australia, "for service to architecture, particularly the new Parliament House, Canberra".  The award became substantive when he adopted Australian citizenship in 2000.

In 1990 Giurgola's second notable Canberra building, the modest St Thomas Aquinas Church in Charnwood opened in 1989, won the RAIA's Canberra Medallion.

In 2001, he was awarded the Australian Centenary Medal, "for service as Principal Architect of the new and permanent Parliament House".

In 2004 his St Patrick's Cathedral, Parramatta, won him Australia's highest architectural award, the RAIA's Sir Zelman Cowen Award for Public Buildings, which he was first awarded in 1989 for the Parliament House.

In 2003 he was awarded an honorary doctorate from the University of Sydney.

A resident of Canberra since the 1980s, by 2005 Giurgola had built his own house at Lake Bathurst near Goulburn.

The portrait of Romaldo Giurgola painted by Mandy Martin, was gifted by the RAIA to the National Portrait Gallery in Canberra in 2005.

Projects
 Wright Brothers National Memorial Visitor Center, Kitty Hawk, North Carolina (1958–60).
 Additions to University of Pennsylvania Museum of Archaeology and Anthropology, Philadelphia, Pennsylvania (1960–73).
 Kenneth and Judy Dayton Residence, Wayzata, Minnesota (1970). Demolished 2016.
 United Fund Headquarters Building, Philadelphia, Pennsylvania (1971).
 Boston Public Library, South End Branch (1971).
 INA Tower, Philadelphia, Pennsylvania (1971–75).
 Penn Mutual Tower, Philadelphia, Pennsylvania (1971–75).
 Columbus East High School, Columbus, Indiana (1972).
 Lang Music Building, Swarthmore College, Swarthmore, Pennsylvania (1973).
 Casa Thomas Jefferson, Brasília, Brazil (1974).
 Liberty Bell Pavilion, Independence National Historical Park, Philadelphia, Pennsylvania (1974–75, demolished 2006).
 Tredyffrin Public Library, Strafford, Pennsylvania (1976).
 Sherman Fairchild Center for the Life Sciences, Columbia University, New York City (1977).
 Wainwright State Office Building, St. Louis, MO (1981).
 Walter Royal Davis Library, UNC, Chapel Hill, NC (1982).
 Parliament House, Canberra, Australia (1981–1988).
 AB Volvo Corporate Headquarters, Gothenburg, Sweden (1984)
 Layfayette Place (now Swissotel), Boston, Massachusetts (1985).
 Virginia Air and Space Center / Hampton Roads History Center, Hampton, VA (1987 / 1992). 
 St Thomas Aquinas Catholic Church, Charnwood, Australian Capital Territory, (1989).
 IBM Advanced Business Institute, Palisades NY (1989).
 Solana Westlake Park, Southlake, TX (1989).
 Life Sciences Building, CIBA Pharmaceuticals, Summit, New Jersey (1994).
 Addition to St Patrick's Cathedral, Parramatta, New South Wales, Australia (2003).

References

External links

1920 births
2016 deaths
20th-century Italian architects
20th-century American architects
Architects from Pennsylvania
Members of the American Academy of Arts and Letters
Columbia University faculty
Sapienza University of Rome alumni
Italian emigrants to the United States
American emigrants to Australia
Naturalised citizens of Australia
Recipients of the Royal Australian Institute of Architects’ Gold Medal
Officers of the Order of Australia
Recipients of the Centenary Medal
Architects of Roman Catholic churches
Architects from Rome
Columbia Graduate School of Architecture, Planning and Preservation alumni
Recipients of the AIA Gold Medal